Table talk or Tabletalk may refer to:

 Table Talk (Cape Town), a weekly local newspaper in Cape Town, South Africa
 Table-Talk (Hazlitt) (1821), a collection of essays by the English essayist, critic, and social commentator William Hazlitt
 Table talk (literature), literary genre, a species of memoir
 Table Talk (Luther) (1566), a collection of the sayings of Martin Luther
 Table Talk (magazine), a former weekly magazine published in Melbourne, Australia
 Table Talk Pies, a brand of pies in the United States
 Table Talk (Plutarch), a set of dialogues in Book VIII of Plutarch's Moralia
 Hitler's Table Talk (Tischgespräche im Führerhauptquartier), a series of World War II monologues delivered by Adolf Hitler
 "Tabletalk", a song by Adam and the Ants, from the album Dirk Wears White Sox